Taugher is a surname of German origin, and an Americanized variant of Taucher. Notable people with the surname include:

Bill Taugher (1906–1943), Canadian ice hockey player
Claude Taugher (1895–1963), American football player

References

Surnames of German origin